The 1924–25 season in Swedish football, starting August 1924 and ending July 1925:

Honours

Official titles

Competitions

Promotions, relegations and qualifications

Promotions

Relegations

Domestic results

Allsvenskan 1924–25

Allsvenskan promotion play-off 1924–25

Division 2 Uppsvenska Serien 1924–25

Division 2 Mellansvenska Serien 1924–25

Division 2 Östsvenska Serien 1924–25

Division 2 Västsvenska Serien 1924–25

Division 2 Sydsvenska Serien 1924–25

Svenska Mästerskapet 1924 
Final

Norrländska Mästerskapet 1925 
Final

Kamratmästerskapen 1924 
False final

Final

National team results 

 Sweden: 

 Sweden: 

 Sweden: 

 Sweden: 

 Sweden: 

 Sweden: 

 Sweden: 

 Sweden: 

 Sweden:

National team players in season 1924/25

Notes

References 
Print

Online

 
Seasons in Swedish football